= Budsberg Pond =

Lake in the state of Wisconsin, United States

- Budsberg Lake; Horton Lake
- Location of Budsberg Pond in Wisconsin Location of Budsberg Pond in the United States
- Location: Portage County, Wisconsin
- Coordinates: 44°32′49″N 89°14′37″W
- Type: lake
- Etymology: Peter Budsberg
- Basin countries: United States
- Surface elevation: 1,093 ft (333 m)

Budsberg Pond is a lake in the U.S. state of Wisconsin.

Variant names are "Budsberg Lake" and "Horton Lake". The lake was named after Peter Budsberg, an original owner of the site.
